Benfieldside is a parish in County Durham, in England. Although not a village in its own right (ecclesiastically it incorporates Shotley Bridge, Bridgehill and much of Blackhill), it is signposted and locally known. From a governance point of view it is a ward of Consett with a population taken at the 2011 census of 6,637.  The name 'Benfieldside' survives in Benfieldside Road, a school of that name, the local tennis club and the church. Its post office no longer exists, though one remains in the village of Shotley Bridge. The Parish Church is dedicated to St. Cuthbert and is situated on Church Bank. The area is situated directly to the north of Consett, to which it is effectively attached.

References

Villages in County Durham
Consett